"Show Yourself" is a song from the 2019 Disney film Frozen II. It is performed by Idina Menzel and Evan Rachel Wood, and written by Kristen Anderson-Lopez and Robert Lopez.

Background
Elsa follows a mysterious voice across the Dark Sea to Ahtohallan.  She explores memories of the past, discovering the secrets of what occurred in the Enchanted Forest and the source of her powers. She sings "Show Yourself" as she dives deeper toward the truth.

The original version of the song was approximately six-and-a-half minutes long.

Lopez gave a similar account: "When we saw the first round of visuals and then we saw it in the film, everyone agreed changes needed to happen. And it went back and forth for months—it’s now four minutes and 20 seconds and it has a big ending. It transformed a lot, and it was hard."

Reception
Show Yourself received acclaim from critics and fans. USA Today wrote "it's a joy to listen to her nail every note in sight". Stuff praised it for incorporating the film's other musical motifs. The New York Times compared its theme of self-acceptance with "Let It Go" from Frozen. Like "Let It Go", the track has also been interpreted as a coming out for the LGBTQ community.

Chart performance

The song debuted at number 99 on the Billboard Hot 100 before rising to 70 in its second week.

Charts

Certifications

References 

2019 songs
Idina Menzel songs
Songs written by Kristen Anderson-Lopez
Songs written by Robert Lopez
Songs from Frozen (franchise)
Disney songs
Songs written for animated films
Songs written for films